Leforest is a commune in the Pas-de-Calais department in the Hauts-de-France region of France.

Geography

Population
The inhabitants are called Leforestois.

Places of interest
 The church of St.Nicolas, dating from the eighteenth century.

See also
Communes of the Pas-de-Calais department

References

External links

 Website of the Agglomération d'Hénin-Carvin 
 Official commune website 

Communes of Pas-de-Calais
Artois